Giants in the Earth is a 1951 Pulitzer Prize-winning opera in three acts and four scenes by composer Douglas Moore. The work uses an English libretto by Arnold Sundgaard (1909–2006) after Ole Edvart Rølvaag's 1924-5 novel of the same name. The idea for the opera was originally conceived by Sundgaard, and depicts a story of tragedy and romance among Norwegian American settlers of Dakota Territory in 1873. Composed during 1949-1949, the work was premiered on March 28, 1951 at Columbia University's Brander Matthews Theatre by the Columbia Opera Workshop.

The Pulitzer jury concluded: "In no opera by an American is there music of such freshness, beauty, and distinctive character. The music has a life of its own apart from its appositeness to the text... Subject, text, and music avoid the cliché and commonplace and combine for an impression of strength and sincerity." Moore's compositional style is highly vocal and features a speech-like, through-composed, "lack of melodic repetition," with a, "fluidity and natural feel [to] the vocal lines." Contrastingly, the lack of character development and liveliness, the almost complete lack of attention grabbing motifs, the length, and the premiere performance have all been criticized. Olin Downes of The New York Times wrote that the opera was mostly, "recitative of little inherent significance."

The premiere cast included soprano Brenda Miller Cooper as the central figure Beret, along with Josh Wheeler, Roy Johnson, Vivian Bauer, Sam Bertsche, Helen Dautrich, James Cosenza, Frances Paige, Raymond Sharp, and Edward Black. In 1963 Moore improved the orchestration and depiction of Beret at the request of Carl Fischer Music.

The runners up for the Pulitzer that year were Quincy Porter's String Quartet No. 8, Peter Mennin's Symphony No. 5, and David Diamond's Symphony No. 3.

Despite its acclaim, in the decades since first being written Giants in the Earth has scarcely been preformed live and no recordings of the opera are accessible to the public. In 2023 following a major donation, the South Dakota Symphony Orchestra announced plans to revive the opera with recordings to be made public via South Dakota Public Broadcasting.

Roles

Synopsis

Act 1
The crest of a low hill, early morning in Spring.

Act 2
Interior of the sod hut of Per Hansa, a June afternoon.

Act 3
Scene 1, Outside the hut. A Sunday morning in September. Scene 2, Interior of the hut. Late at night in February.

References

External links
 "Moore's Opera Makes World Debut Tonight", Spectator Archive.

1951 operas
English-language operas
Operas based on novels
Operas
Operas by Douglas Moore
Operas set in the United States
Pulitzer Prize for Music-winning works